Protoreaster is a genus of sea stars in the family Oreasteridae from the Indo-Pacific. They are sometimes seen in the marine aquarium trade.

Species
The following species are in the genus:

Bibliography

References

Oreasteridae
Taxa named by Ludwig Heinrich Philipp Döderlein